Never Enough: The Best of Jesus Jones is a compilation album/greatest hits album by British alternative rock/dance band Jesus Jones, released by the band's former record label EMI on 27 May 2002.

The band's previous album London was released on Mi5 Recordings. For this album, EMI could not obtain the rights to the Mi5 recordings by the band and thus no songs from that album feature on this album.

Although mainly a greatest hits album, some songs which were never singles feature on disc one. Disc two was a bonus disc on initial copies and is entirely made up of remixes of songs by the band originally either B-sides or 12" singles.

One new song, "Come on Home", features at the end of disc one. This had been previously unreleased and recorded some time before release.

Track listing

Never Enough
"Info Freako" - 2:49
"Never Enough" - 2:41
"Bring it on Down" - 2:37
"Move Mountains" (Dave Chapman 7" Mix) - 3:21 (This was only released originally as a live single)
"All the Answers" - 3:48 (Not a single originally, instead an album track on Liquidizer)
"Real, Real, Real" (7" Mix Rhythm) - 3:06
"International Bright Young Thing" - 3:17
"Who, Where, Why?" (7" Crisis Mix) - 3:08  (The original album version on Doubt was not the single, instead the Crisis Mix was)
"Right Here, Right Now" - 3:09
"Blissed" - 4:49 (Not a single originally, instead an album track on Doubt)
"The Devil You Know" - 3:48
"Zeroes and Ones" - 3:24
"The Right Decision" - 3:37
"Idiot Stare" (Not a single originally, instead an album track on Perverse)
"The Next Big Thing" - 4:03
"Chemical #1" - 3:26
"They're Out There" - 4:02 (Not a single originally, instead an album track on Already)
"February" - 6:42 (Not a single originally, instead an album track on Already)
"Come on Home" - 3:53 (Previously unreleased. Also released as a promotional single in 2002)

Disc two (Bonus disc)
"Info Sicko" - 4:50
"Enough" - 3:22 (Sometimes subtitled "Never Enough")
"Beat it Down" - 4:23
"Move Mountains" (Ben Chapman Mix) - 5:04 (7" Mix on Disc One)
"Right Here Right Now" (The Martyn Philips Mix) - 5:47
"Real Real Real" (Paul Harding "Luxury" 12" Mix) - 7:00 (Originally a 12" single)
"Ibyt" - 5:48
"Who? Where? Why?" (12 Foot Mix) - 5:25
"The Devil You Know" (Satellite Over Tehran Mix) - 5:42
"The Right Decision" (Moody Reconstruction Mix) - 6:38
"Zeroes and Ones" (The Prodigy vs. Jesus Jones) - 5:43 (The "vs." subtitle is given on the album and on the original 1993 version on Zeroes and Ones. This is actually the name of the artist though, with "Zeroes and Ones" being the song title alone)
"Zeroes and Ones" (Aphex Twin Reconstruction #1 Mix) - 8:00

Original releases
Disc one:
Tracks 1-5 originally on Liquidizer
Tracks 6-10 originally on Doubt
Tracks 11-14 originally on Perverse
Tracks 15-18 originally on Already
Track 19 is originally from this album
Disc two:
Track 1 originally from "Info Freako"
Track 2 originally from "Never Enough"
Track 3 originally from Scratched
Track 4 originally from Liquidzer
Tracks 5, 6, 8 originally from Doubt
Track 7 originally from "International Bright Young Thing"
Tracks 9-12 originally from Perverse

Personnel
Nick Davies - Mixing
Richard Norris - Engineer
Martin Phillipps - Producer, Engineer
Andy Ross - A&R
Alan Winstanley - Producer, Mixing
Liam Howlett - Remix Producer
Michael J. Ade - Engineer
Nigel Reeve - Compilation, A&R
Andrew Day - Photography
Ben Chapman - Mixing
Clive Langer - Producer, Mixing
Craig Leon - Producer
Aphex Twin - Remixing
Chris Blair - Mastering
Ian Curnow - Producer, Mixing, Remixing
Spike Drake - Mixing Engineer
Mike Edwards - Producer, Compilation, Mixing
John Fryer - Mixing
Clive Goddard - Engineer
Phil Harding - Producer, Remixing, Mixing

2002 compilation albums
Jesus Jones albums
EMI Records compilation albums